Loux is a surname. Notable people with the surname include:

Barret Loux (born 1989), American baseball player
John Loux (1818–1886), Canadian politician
Michael J. Loux (born 1942), American philosopher
Ryan Le Loux (born 1984), Australian cricketer 
Shane Loux (born 1979), American baseball player

See also
Loux (company)